Yuriy Alimovych Halushkin (born 26 June 1971) is a Ukrainian brigadier general and former Commander of the Territorial Defense Forces from 1 January 2022 until May 15 2022. On 15 May 2022 Yuriy Halushkin was dismissed by president Zelensky and replaced with Major General Ihor Tantsyura as Commander of the Territorial Defense Forces of the Ukrainian Armed Forces.

References

Ukrainian generals
1971 births
Living people
People from Khorol